Sophia Frances Morgan is a Fijian sailor, who came second in the Women's Laser Radial team event at the 2019 Pacific Games. She competed in the laser radial event at the delayed 2020 Summer Olympics.

Personal life
Morgan grew up in Lami, Fiji, and as a youngster, she played football in Rewa. Morgan moved to New Zealand for high school. She now studies at Epsom Girls' Grammar School in Auckland, New Zealand. Her father is also a sailor.

Career
Morgan started sailing at the Royal Suva Yacht Club. She chose to move to New Zealand to be involved in more competitive sailing competitions. She came second in the Women's Laser Radial team event at the 2019 Pacific Games, alongside Nelle Leenders. In January 2020, she competed at the joint Australian and Oceania Championships, and the Australian Youth Championships.

At the 2020 Women's Laser Radial World Championship, Morgan was the best place sailor from the Oceania region. As a result, she qualified for the 2020 Summer Olympics. She participated in the laser radial event, and was the only Fijian sailor at the Games. After qualifying for the Olympics, Morgan was invited to train with the New Zealand Youth sailing squad. She also received a scholarship from the International Olympic Committee to fund her appearance at the Games. In March 2020, Morgan came third in a college schools Starling class event.

In January 2021, she came second in the youth event at the New Zealand Laser National Championships, and in April, she came second in the Girl's Youth Laser Radial event at the Oceanbridge NZL Sailing Regatta. In May, she was the third woman, and seventh overall, at the NSFW Laser Championships. She came third in two races at the event. At the Olympics, Morgan finished 42nd overall.

References

External links

2003 births
Living people
Fijian female sailors (sport)
Fijian expatriate sportspeople in New Zealand
Sailors at the 2020 Summer Olympics – Laser Radial
Olympic sailors of Fiji